Saryarka is a Line 1 station of Almaty Metro that was open on 30 May 2022. It was originally planned to be opened in 2018, however the completion date was moved to 2022. The  station is located near Family Park.

Almaty Metro stations
Railway stations opened in 2022
2022 establishments in Kazakhstan